Mangal Sein (1927–1990) was a leader of Bharatiya Janata Party from Haryana and the deputy chief minister of Haryana from 1977 to 1979. He was elected to Haryana Legislative Assembly from Rohtak seven times. He served as President of state unit of BJP a later configuration of Jan Sangh.

References

1990 deaths
Deputy chief ministers of Haryana
Bharatiya Janata Party politicians from Haryana
1927 births
Haryana MLAs 1968–1972
People from Rohtak
Bharatiya Jana Sangh politicians
State cabinet ministers of Haryana
Janata Party politicians